Enaphalodes seminitidus is a species of beetle in the family Cerambycidae. It was described by Horn in 1885.

References

Elaphidiini
Beetles described in 1885